Ibrahim Mahmoud Abdulhalim (1931 – 4 September 1963) was an Egyptian rower and police officer. He competed in the men's eight event at the 1960 Summer Olympics. He was killed in the crash of Swissair Flight 306.

He had graduated from the University of Cairo prior to his death.

References

External links

1931 births
1963 deaths
Egyptian male rowers
Olympic rowers of Egypt
Rowers at the 1960 Summer Olympics
Place of birth missing
20th-century Egyptian people